The 2000 SEC Championship Game was won by the Florida Gators 28–6 over the Auburn Tigers. The game was played in the Georgia Dome in Atlanta, Georgia on December 2, 2000 and was televised to a national audience on ABC.

See also
 Auburn–Florida football rivalry

References

External links
Recap of the game from SECsports.com
Box score and statistics from AuburnTigers.com 
Box score and statistics from GatorZone.com

SEC Championship Game
SEC Championship Game
Auburn Tigers football games
Florida Gators football games
December 2000 sports events in the United States
2000 in sports in Georgia (U.S. state)
2000 in Atlanta